Islami Bishwakosh is an encyclopedia published by the Islamic Foundation Bangladesh. It is of 25 volumes and also a concise version. The project's leading founder was Abdul Haque Faridi, a Bangladeshi educator and scholar.

History 
The first Islami Bishwakosh of Bangladesh project was launched by Bangla Academy. Dr Muhammad Shahidullah served as an editor for the project for a while. In 1958, the Shorter Encyclopedia of Islam was published from Leiden and it was a translation. Work on the encyclopedia was later passed on to the Islamic Foundation Bangladesh for a number of reasons, from which it was later edited more and published.

Whilst Abdul Haque Faridi was president of the encyclopedia's editorial board, 18 volumes were completed during his lifetime.

After the independence of Bangladesh in 1971, it was one of the three specialised encyclopedias that were published. Dr A F M Khalid Hossain edited volumes 3 to 9 of the encyclopedia's second edition.

References 

Islamic studies
Bengali language
Bengali encyclopedias
20th-century encyclopedias
Bangladeshi encyclopedias
Encyclopedias of Islam

ur:اسلامی وشوکوش
hi:इस्लामी विश्वकोश
pnb:اسلامی وشوکوش
as:ইছলামী বিশ্বকোষ
bpy:ইছলামী বিশ্বকোষ